The Chinese built Miniature Neutron Source reactor (MNSR) is a small and compact research reactor modeled on the Canadian HEU SLOWPOKE-2 design.

The MNSR is tank-in-pool type, with highly enriched fuel (~ 90% U235 ). The tank is immersed in a large pool, and the core is, in turn, immersed in the tank. The maximum nominal power is ~ 30 kW, the power being removed by natural convection. The central core is formed of about 347 fuel rods, with 4 tie rods and 3 dummy elements distributed on a total of ten circles, each consisting of a number of fuel rods ranging between 6 and 62. A thick beryllium reflector (~ 10 cm) surrounds the core radially.

China operates two MNSRs and has supplied Ghana, Iran, Pakistan, Nigeria and Syria with reactors of this type as well as the highly enriched uranium (HEU) to fuel them. Since 1978, various national and international activities have been underway to convert research and test reactors from the use of HEU to LEU fuel.

References

See also
 Swimming pool reactor
 Nuclear reactor
 Nuclear power
 Nuclear fission
 Nuclear power plant
 Research reactor
 Nuclear proliferation

Nuclear reactors
Neutron sources
Nuclear technology in Pakistan
Nuclear research reactors